Ítalo Manzine Amaral Duarte Garófalo (born 13 March 1992) is a Brazilian competitive swimmer who specializes in freestyle.

In April 2016, at the Maria Lenk Trophy, held in Rio de Janeiro, he made César Cielo, the 2008 Olympic gold medalist in the 50-metre freestyle, fail to qualify for the 2016 Summer Olympics. In the 50-metre freestyle, Cielo won the heats with 21.99, staying temporarily with the Brazil's second vacancy. However, in the final, Ítalo Duarte finished second, with a time of 21.82. Cielo finished third, with  a time of 21.91. Brazil's Olympic vacancies were with Bruno Fratus and Ítalo Duarte.

He participated in the 2016 Summer Olympics in Rio de Janeiro, swimming the 50 meter freestyle. He swam the 13th time in the heats and qualified for the semifinals, where he was eliminated.

References

External links 
 
 
 

1992 births
Living people
Brazilian male freestyle swimmers
Olympic swimmers of Brazil
Swimmers at the 2016 Summer Olympics
Universiade medalists in swimming
Universiade silver medalists for Brazil
Medalists at the 2017 Summer Universiade
Sportspeople from Belo Horizonte
20th-century Brazilian people
21st-century Brazilian people